Tates Bluff is an unincorporated community in Ouachita County, Arkansas, United States. The Tate's Bluff Fortification, which is listed on the National Register of Historic Places, is located near Tates Bluff.

References

Unincorporated communities in Ouachita County, Arkansas
Unincorporated communities in Arkansas